Amm or AMM may refer to:

Entertainment

Music
AMM (group), British free improvisation group

Television
Amy's Mythic Mornings, an educational show on APTN Kids

Video games
 Automated MatchMaking, in the context of the Warcraft III Ladder system

Finance
 Automated Market Maker, a term in Decentralized finance

Organizations 
 Association for Machines and Mechanisms
 Aceh Monitoring Mission

Museum
 Museum of Anatolian Civilizations (Anadolu Medeniyetleri Müzesi), a museum in Ankara, Turkey

Publications 
 American Mathematical Monthly, a mathematics journal
 American Metal Market, a metals and mining trade publication

Religion 
 Ahmadiyya Muslim Mission - for the Ahmadiyya sect in Islam
'Amm, a Qatabanian moon god.

Science, technology, and medicine 
 Advanced Metering Management
 Agnogenic myeloid metaplasia, a disease of the bone marrow
 Air Mass Meter, see mass flow sensor
 Automatic Memory management
 Automatic Memory Management of an Oracle Database System Global Area

Transportation 
 3-letter code for Amherst (Amtrak station) in Massachusetts
 The IATA Code for Queen Alia International Airport, Amman, Jordan
 Aircraft maintenance manual, or airplane maintenance manual

Other uses 
 Aviation Machinist's Mate, a rank of the U.S. Navy